Bloxham or Bloxam is a surname, and may refer to:

 Albert Bloxham (1905–1996), English footballer 
 Andrew Bloxam  (1801–1878), English clergyman and naturalist
 Donald Bloxham, British historian 
 Elizabeth Bloxham (1877-1962), Irish feminist and nationalist
 Jenny Bloxham (21st century), former New Zealand politician
 John Francis Bloxam (1873–1928), English churchman and author
 John Rouse Bloxam (1807–1891), English academic and clergyman
 Josh Bloxham (born 1990), New Zealand basketball player
 Ken Bloxham (1954–2000), New Zealand rugby union footballer
 Matthew Bloxam (1805–1888), English antiquary and archaeologist
Matthew Bloxam (MP) (1744–1822), British businessman and politician
 Tom Bloxham (born 1963), British property developer
 William D. Bloxham (1835–1911), American politician